Elsa Hellquist (15 June 1886 – 7 May 1983) was a Swedish fencer. She competed in the women's individual foil event at the 1924 Summer Olympics.

References

External links
 

1886 births
1983 deaths
Swedish female foil fencers
Olympic fencers of Sweden
Fencers at the 1924 Summer Olympics
Sportspeople from Stockholm
20th-century Swedish women